Liyabé Kpatoumbi (born 25 May 1986 in Atakpamé) is a Togolese football striker, who plays for ASKO Kara.

Career
Kpatoumbi began his profi career 2008 with ASKO Kara who scored 15 goals in his first season.

International career
He earned his first internationally match on 14 October 2009 in a friendly game against Japan national football team and played the 2010 UEMOA Tournament.

References

External links

1986 births
Living people
Togolese footballers
Togo international footballers
ASKO Kara players
Association football forwards
21st-century Togolese people